Göran (Georg) Rothman (30 November 1739, in Husebybruk, Småland, Sweden – 3 December 1778, in Stockholm), was a  Swedish naturalist, physician and an apostle of Carl Linnaeus. 

His father, Johan Stensson Rothman, was a teacher of Logic and Physics at a grammar school in Växjö, the same school that Carl von Linne attended. Their good relationship dated back to that period. Göran Rothman studied at Uppsala University from 1757 and graduated under Carl von Linne. On 27 May 1763 he defended a dissertation on the disease Raphania (ergotism), thought by Linnaeus to be caused by eating bread from freshly harvested grain and wrongly ascribed to the presence of seed of Raphanus raphanistrum L., the common radish.

In 1765 he carried out research in Åland and from 1773 to 1776 in Libya and Tunisia. On his return he practised as physician in Stockholm.

He was notable for his translations of Voltaire (1694–1778) and Alexander Pope (1688–1744) into Swedish. The plant genus Rothmannia was named after him by his friend, the Swedish botanist Carl Peter Thunberg.

External links
 Biography
 Dissertation under Linnaeus
 Eintrag im Svenskt biografiskt handlexikon
 Apostles of Linnaeus

References

Swedish naturalists
18th-century Swedish botanists
1739 births
1778 deaths
Botanists with author abbreviations
Age of Liberty people